The Public Audit (Wales) Act 2004 (c 23) is an Act of the Parliament of the United Kingdom.

Part 1

Section 2
This section was repealed by section 163 of, and Schedule 12 to, the Government of Wales Act 2006.

Sections 6 to 11
These sections were repealed by section 163 of, and Schedule 12 to, the Government of Wales Act 2006.

Part 2

Chapter 1

Section 12
Section 12(1)(ba) was inserted by article 2(2) of the Public Audit (Wales) Act 2004 (Amendment) (Local Government Bodies in Wales) Order 2021 (SI 2021/349) (W 101). Section 12(1)(fa) was inserted by paragraph 337(b) of the Police Reform and Social Responsibility Act 2011. Section 12(1)(j) was inserted by paragraph 13(5)(a) of Schedule 1 to the Offender Management Act 2007.

Section 13
Section 13 was substituted by section 11(1) of the Public Audit (Wales) Act 2013.

Sections 14 to 16
Sections 14 and 15 were repealed by paragraph 21 of Schedule 4 to the Public Audit (Wales) Act 2013. Sections 16 was repealed by paragraph 22 of Schedule 4 to the Public Audit (Wales) Act 2013.

Section 17
Sections 17(3) and (4) were repealed by paragraph 23(3) of Schedule 4 to the Public Audit (Wales) Act 2013.

Sections 18 and 19
Sections 18 and 19 were repealed by paragraph 24 of Schedule 4 to the Public Audit (Wales) Act 2013.

Section 20
Section 20(A1) was inserted by paragraph 25(2) of Schedule 4 to the Public Audit (Wales) Act 2013. Section 20(2)(b) was substituted by paragraph 25(5)(c) of Schedule 4 to the Public Audit (Wales) Act 2013. Section 20(3) was repealed by paragraph 25(6) of Schedule 4 to the Public Audit (Wales) Act 2013. Section 20(5A) was inserted by paragraph 25(9) of Schedule 4 to the Public Audit (Wales) Act 2013. Section 20(6) was repealed by paragraph 25(10) of Schedule 4 to the Public Audit (Wales) Act 2013.

Section 21
Section 21 was repealed by paragraph 26 of Schedule 4 to the Public Audit (Wales) Act 2013.

Section 24
Section 24(2)(e) was inserted by paragraph 13(5)(b) of Schedule 1 to the Offender Management Act 2007.

Section 25
Section 25(3)(e) was inserted by paragraph 13(5)(c) of Schedule 1 to the Offender Management Act 2007. Section 25(8A) was inserted by article 2(3) of the Public Audit (Wales) Act 2004 (Amendment) (Local Government Bodies in Wales) Order 2021.

Section 26
Section 26(3)(aa) was inserted by regulation 2(3)(a)(ii) of the Local Government and Elections (Wales) Act 2021 (Consequential Amendments and Miscellaneous Provisions) Regulations 2021 (SI 2021/356) (W 107). Sections 26(3A) and (3B) were inserted by regulation 2(3)(b) of the Local Government and Elections (Wales) Act 2021 (Consequential Amendments and Miscellaneous Provisions) Regulations 2021.

Section 28
Section 28(4) was repealed by paragraph 33(3) of Schedule 4 to the Public Audit (Wales) Act 2013.

Section 33
Section 33(12) was repealed by paragraph 38(8) of Schedule 4 to the Public Audit (Wales) Act 2013.

Section 37
Section 37(5)(a) was repealed by paragraph 42(5) of Schedule 4 to the Public Audit (Wales) Act 2013.

Section 40
Section 40(3) was inserted by paragraph 338(5) of the Police Reform and Social Responsibility Act 2011.

Chapter 2

Section 41
Sections 41(7) to (9) were inserted by paragraph 48 of Schedule 3 to the Regulation and Inspection of Social Care (Wales) Act 2016.

Section 43
This section was repealed by paragraph 60 of Schedule 12 to the Local Audit and Accountability Act 2014.

Section 45
Section 45(9) was inserted by paragraph 49(4) of Schedule 4 to the Public Audit (Wales) Act 2013.

Chapter 3
This Chapter consists of section 50. That section gives effect to Schedule 1.

Chapter 4

Section 51
Section 51(2) was repealed by paragraph 52(2) of Schedule 4 to the Public Audit (Wales) Act 2013. Section 51(3)(a) was substituted by paragraph 52(3) of Schedule 4 to the Public Audit (Wales) Act 2013.

Section 52
Section 52(6) was repealed by paragraph 53(3) of Schedule 4 to the Public Audit (Wales) Act 2013. Section 52(9) was inserted by paragraph 53(5) of Schedule 4 to the Public Audit (Wales) Act 2013.

Section 54
Section 54(1)(aa) was inserted by section 160(a) of the Local Government and Elections (Wales) Act 2021. Sections 54(2)(ba) and (bb) were inserted by section 160(b) of the Local Government and Elections (Wales) Act 2021. Section 54(2)(f) was repealed by article 2(2) of the Public Audit (Wales) Act 2004 (Relaxation of Restriction on Disclosure) Order 2005 (SI 2005/1018).

Sections 54(2ZA) to (2ZD) were inserted by section 167(2) of the Local Government and Public Involvement in Health Act 2007. Section 54(2ZB) was repealed by paragraph 55(5) of Schedule 4 to the Public Audit (Wales) Act 2013. Sections 54(6) to (8) were repealed by paragraph 55(7) of Schedule 4 to the Public Audit (Wales) Act 2013.

Section 54(2A) was inserted by article 2(3) of the Public Audit (Wales) Act 2004 (Relaxation of Restriction on Disclosure) Order 2005. Section 54(2A) was repealed by section 167(3) of the Local Government and Public Involvement in Health Act 2007.

Section 54(4)(b) was repealed by section 167(5)(b) of the Local Government and Public Involvement in Health Act 2007.

Section 54ZA
This section was inserted by section 167(6) of the Local Government and Public Involvement in Health Act 2007.

Section 54A
This section was inserted by article 2(4) of the Public Audit (Wales) Act 2004 (Relaxation of Restriction on Disclosure) Order 2005. This section was repealed by section 167(7) of the Local Government and Public Involvement in Health Act 2007.

Section 57
This section was repealed by paragraph 61 of Schedule 12 to the Local Audit and Accountability Act 2014.

Section 59
Sections 59(2) and (3) were repealed by paragraph 59 of Schedule 4 to the Public Audit (Wales) Act 2013. Section 59(4) was repealed by section 241 of, and Part 8 of Schedule 18 to, the Local Government and Public Involvement in Health Act 2007. Section 59(9) was inserted by article 2(4) of the Public Audit (Wales) Act 2004 (Amendment) (Local Government Bodies in Wales) Order 2021.

Part 3

Section 62
Section 62(b) was repealed by paragraph 62(2) of Schedule 12 to the Local Audit and Accountability Act 2014.

Section 64
Section 64(3) was substituted by paragraph 77(c) of Schedule 5 to the Health and Social Care Act 2008.

Part 3A
This Part was inserted by paragraph 4 of Schedule 7 to the Serious Crime Act 2007.

Section 64D
New sections 64D(3)(a) to (ab) were substituted for section 64D(3)(a) by paragraph 63(4) of Schedule 12 to the Local Audit and Accountability Act 2014. Section 64D(6)(b)(ii) was substituted by paragraph 63(6) of Schedule 12 to the Local Audit and Accountability Act 2014. Section 64D(6)(b)(iv) was substituted by paragraph 65(3) of Schedule 4 to the Public Audit (Wales) Act 2013.

Section 64F
Section 64F(A1) was inserted by paragraph 67(2) of Schedule 4 to the Public Audit (Wales) Act 2013. Sections 64F(9) and (10) were inserted by paragraph 67(7) of Schedule 4 to the Public Audit (Wales) Act 2013.

Part 4

Section 65
Section 65(2) was repealed by section 163 of, and Schedule 12 to, the Government of Wales Act 2006.

Section 67A
This section was inserted by paragraph 60 of Schedule 14 to the Police and Justice Act 2006.

Section 67A(1)(e) was repealed by paragraph 17 of Schedule 1 to the Public Bodies (Abolition of Her Majesty’s Inspectorate of Courts Administration and the Public Guardian Board) Order 2012 (SI 2012/2401). Section 67A(3) was inserted by paragraph 69(4) of Schedule 4 to the Public Audit (Wales) Act 2013.

Section 67B
This section was inserted by paragraph 3 of Schedule 5 to the Public Services Ombudsman (Wales) Act 2019.

Sections 69 and 70
These sections were repealed by paragraph 64 of Schedule 12 to the Local Audit and Accountability Act 2014.

Section 73 - Commencement
The following orders have been made under section 73(1):
The Public Audit (Wales) Act 2004 (Commencement No. 1) Order 2005 (S.I. 2005/71 (W. 9) (C. 3))
The Public Audit (Wales) Act 2004 (Commencement No. 2 and Transitional Provisions and Savings) Order 2005 (S.I. 2005/558 (W. 48) (C. 24))
The Public Audit (Wales) Act 2004 (Commencement No. 3) Order 2005 (S.I. 2005/1911 (W. 154) (C. 83))

Schedule 1
Paragraph 4 and paragraphs 5(2), (4), (6), (9) and 13 were repealed by section 241 of, and Part 8 of Schedule 18 to, the Local Government and Public Involvement in Health Act 2007. Paragraph 14 was repealed by paragraph 123(c) of Schedule 12 to the Local Audit and Accountability Act 2014.

Schedule 2
Paragraphs 2 and 38(2) were repealed by section 80 of, and Schedule 9 to, the Health Act 2006. Paragraph 5(3) was repealed by article 7 of, and Schedule 4 to, the Housing and Regeneration Act 2008 (Consequential Provisions) Order 2010 (SI 2010/866). Paragraphs 9(2) and 20(b) were repealed by paragraph 123(c) of Schedule 12 to the Local Audit and Accountability Act 2014. Paragraph 14 was repealed by section 6 of, and Schedule 4 to, the National Health Service (Consequential Provisions) Act 2006. Paragraph 15 was repealed by section 147 of, and Part 1 of Schedule 14 to, the Welfare Reform Act 2012. Paragraph 18 was repealed by section 184 of, and Part 5 of Schedule 18 to, the Education and Inspections Act 2006. Paragraphs 21 to 26 and 32 to 38 were repealed by section 1 of, and Part 2 of Schedule 1 to, the Local Audit and Accountability Act 2014. Paragraphs 27 to 30 and 37 were repealed by section 321(1) of, and Schedule 16 to, the Housing and Regeneration Act 2008. Paragraphs 27(2)(b), 29(2) and 31 were repealed by section 241 of, and Part 11 of Schedule 18 to, the Local Government and Public Involvement in Health Act 2007. Paragraph 40 was repealed by section 266 of, and Part 9 of Schedule 16 to, the Apprenticeships, Skills, Children and Learning Act 2009. Paragraphs 43 and 45 were repealed by section 163 of, and Schedule 12 to, the Government of Wales Act 2006. Paragraphs 53(2), 54 and 55(2) were repealed by section 237 of, and Part 5 of Schedule 25 to, the Localism Act 2011.

Schedule 3
Paragraph 1(1)(b) was repealed by paragraph 65(2) of Schedule 12 to the Local Audit and Accountability Act 2014. Paragraph 2(c) was repealed by paragraph 65(3)(c) of Schedule 12 to the Local Audit and Accountability Act 2014.

References
"Public Audit (Wales) Act 2004". Halsbury's Statutes of England and Wales. Fourth Edition. 2009 Reissue. Volume 26(2). Page 446.
"Public Audit (Wales) Act 2004". Current Law Statutes 2004. Sweet & Maxwell. London. W Green. Edinburgh. 2005. Volume 2. Chapter 23.

External links
The Public Audit (Wales) Act 2004, as amended from the National Archives.
The Public Audit (Wales) Act 2004, as originally enacted from the National Archives.
Explanatory notes to the Public Audit (Wales) Act 2004.

United Kingdom Acts of Parliament 2004
Acts of the Parliament of the United Kingdom concerning Wales
2004 in Wales
Audit legislation
Auditing in the United Kingdom